Lingwa de planeta (also Lidepla or LdP) is a constructed international auxiliary language based on widely spoken languages of the world, including Arabic, Mandarin, English, French, German, Hindi, Persian, Portuguese, Russian, and Spanish.

The main idea of Lidepla is a harmonious whole on the base of the most widespread and influential national languages. The intention is also for it to have something in common with the native languages of most people. With the various source languages from across the globe, it is one of the a posteriori languages.

Development of the language began in 2006 in Saint  Petersburg, Russia, by a group of enthusiasts, with Dmitri Ivanov being the project leader. The basic version of the language was published in June 2010.

Alphabet and pronunciation 
The official Lidepla alphabet is based on the Latin script and contains the following 25 letters, and their upper case equivalents:

The letter q is not used, and c occurs only in the digraph “ch”. The letter y represents the same vowel as “i”, but is never stressed. The following digraphs and letters are pronounced as follows, with examples:

 ch – /t͡ʃ/ as in “cheese”: chay — tea
 -ng, at the end of a word – /ŋ/ as in fang: feng — wind
 sh – /ʃ/ as in “shoes”: shi — ten

 j – /d͡ʒ/ as in “Jack”: jan — to know
 z – /d͡z/: zun — to go in for
 x – /ks/ as in “extra”: examen — exam

-ng- in the middle of a word is pronounced /ŋg/ (as is “ng” in finger). v and ending -ng may alternatively be pronounced as  /w/ (as in wood) and /n/ (nose), respectively. x between two vowels may be slightly voiced, and x before a consonant may be pronounced as /s/.

Some learning material uses /h/ for the letter h. The grammar allows that pronunciation, but gives /x/ as ch in German Fach as the primary.

For more details on the phonology, see the section Phonology below.

Stress 
The general rule regarding the stress is:

 the vowel before the last consonant (or “y”) is stressed: máta (mother), família (family), akshám (evening), ruchéy (brook)

Lidepla tries to preserve the original sounding of the international words, though, so there are some exceptions, as follows, in short:

 some endings (-um, -us, -er, -en; -ik-, -ul-, and most but not all suffixes) are never stressed
 the doubled vowel is always stressed (like in adyoo, “bye”)

Description and grammar 
The main idea behind Lidepla was to create a harmonious whole on the base of the most widespread and influential national languages of the planet. That results in the Lidepla vocabulary containing a fairly significant amount of non-European words, which makes Lidepla a world language. A general design principle for Lidepla was to have something in common with the native languages of most of the people on Earth.

The Lidepla grammar is based on three rules, the rule of the constant form, the rule of belonging to a word class, and the rule of direct word order.

Rule of the constant form 
The word form never changes. Special particles are used to express the grammatical meanings, for example:

 me lubi – I love
 li lubi – they love
 yu ve lubi – you will love
 me wud lubi – I would love
 lubi (ba) – love!

The only two exceptions are: 
 the plural of nouns, which is made by adding the suffix -s: kitaba (book) — kitabas (books), flor (flower) — flores (flowers), and
 the verb to be, which has its own forms:
 bi for the indefinite
 es for the present
 bin for the past

Rule of belonging to a word class 
Every Lidepla word belongs to a word class – noun, verb, adjective, adverb, etc. Derivation takes place by means of affixes and particles:

  – to love (verb)
  – love (noun)
  – loving (adjective)
  – lovingly, with love (adverb)

There are no fixed endings for the word classes; there are preferable ones, though. Thus, most verbs end in i, but there are some exceptions (for example:  – to know,  – to talk, etc).

Derivation 
By means of affixes and particles, new words can be made up, both of the same class and of the other. For example:

Principle of necessity 
The use of a special particle is optional if its meaning is clear from the context. For example:

 Yeri me miti ela – "Yesterday, I met her", and
 Manya me miti ela – "Tomorrow, I'll meet her"

both lack particles indicating time, because it is already obvious from "yesterday" and "tomorrow". In the same manner:

 Me vidi mucho kinda – "I see a lot of children"

lacks the plural indicating ending -s, because the plural is already indicated by mucho, in contrast to:

 Me vidi kindas – "I see children"

that uses the plural "-s" ending.

Rule of direct word order 
The word order in a sentence is usually direct; that is, subject — predicate — object, attribute goes before the noun, prepositions are before the noun group they refer to.

If the word order is changed, it is shown by the use of special particles. For example, den is put before the object, like this:

 Ela lubi lu – “She loves him”, versus
 Den lu ela lubi, with the same meaning (literally “Him she loves”) – where the object lu is marked by placing den before it.

Personal pronouns 
The basic personal pronouns of Lidepla are:

{| class="wikitable" style="text-align:center;"
! person
! singular
! plural
|-
! 1
| me
| nu
|-
! 2
| yu
| yu
|-
! rowspan="2" | 3
| ta
| rowspan="2" | li
|-
| it
|}

There is a distinction in third person singular between animate and inanimate: ta is used for humans and animals (corresponding to he/him, she/her, and it when used about an animal), and it about things and objects. If the speaker wishes to distinguish gender, there is also third person singular ela (she, her) and lu (he, him).

Just as in English, second person plural (you, you all) and singular (you) are both the same word: yu. Lidepla also has an indefinite personal pronoun: oni (one, they as in “they say that...”, and “one does not...”).

Possessive forms 
The short form of the possessive pronouns looks like this:

{| class="wikitable" style="text-align:center;"
! person
! singular
! plural
|-
! 1
| may
| nuy
|-
! 2
| yur
| yur
|-
! 3
| suy
| ley
|-
|}

The third person singular suy is universal and can be used as the possessive form for both ta, it, ela and lu – for ela  and lu there's also the forms elay and luy.

The suffix -ney is used to form adjectives from nouns. Therefore, it is also possible to form longer possessive pronouns with the base form and the suffix -ney: mi-ney, yu-ney, etc.

Verbs 
Verb roots never change in Lidepla. Verbs belong to one of two types: 

Tense are formed by particles, or by suffixes.

Vocabulary 
Most Lidepla vocabulary is made up of international words of Latin origin. The most frequent words, though, are of English, Russian, Chinese, Arabic and Hindi origin. There are not definite endings for different parts of speech, so nearly any word can be easily incorporated. The words are adapted to Lidepla phonology and do not preserve original orthography – the pronunciation is preserved in first hand, not the spelling.

As of 2014, the Lidepla vocabulary had about 4,000 entries, meaning about 10,000 individual words, with an increasing number. For a word to be incorporated, the following principles are taken into account:
 short words without consonant clusters are preferred
 the word has to be widespread and/or phonetically familiar for speakers of at least a few different national languages. For example, the word darba (strike), of Arabic origin, is close to Russian "удар" (udar; strike), Chinese "打" (dǎ; to strike), and even English "drub".

Similarity examples 
Whole Lidepla phrases sometimes sound very close to national languages ones, with the same meaning:
  is similar to its equivalent in Russian (The brother is thinking about it again)
  to Chinese  (They don't want to talk)
  to English Why do you go back? or Why are you going back?
  to Hindi (I know that mother likes to drink tea), and
  is similar to Arabic   (In the morning I travel)

Phonology 
There are 17 basic consonants (b, d, g; p, t, k; w, f; s, ʃ; x; d͡ʒ, d͡z; m, n, r, l) and 3 optional ones (v; t͡ʃ; ŋ) in Lidepla.

Distinction of the sounds w — v, d͡ʒ — t͡ʃ is not obligatory, that is they may be pronounced in the same way, as there are no minimal pairs for them. The ŋ sound is the same as in English (in -ing ending).

There are 5 vowels (a, e, i, o, u) in the language.

Development and use 
The project is led by the psychologist Dmitri Ivanov. He laid the foundation of the language, using mainly the ideas of Otto Jespersen on the Novial language, and also the facts of Creole language development and structure, while linguists A. Vinogradova and E. Ivanova helped a lot during the early period of development. In 2007 A. Lysenko joined and became the main linguist of the project.

From the very beginning the project was open and widely discussed in a number of conlanger groups. , more than 15 people contributed to the language considerably (that is, worked on vocabulary and grammar, translated and wrote original texts, including songs), not speaking about those who participated in discussions.

The basic version of the language was published on June 1, 2010. In some sources, the date of creation of Lidepla is stated to be 2006. It is thus important to clarify that the "basic version" of the language – that is, the version after which the basics of the language is not to be changed – was not published until 2010.

At the moment, the language is used mainly on the Internet, when it comes to direct communication. About 10–15 people have mastered the language, and about 50 can use it in communication. A lot of texts have been translated, including rather spacious texts like Alice's Adventures in Wonderland by Lewis Carroll, and Sailor Ruterford in Maori captivity by Nikolay Chukovsky (son of Korney Chukovsky; translated from Russian), and also some tales. There are songs both written and translated, including an album by musician Jonny M, and subtitles made for cartoons and movies (like the popular Russian film Ivan Vasilievich: Back to the Future).

In 2017, a request was sent to the International Organization for Standardization as an attempt to obtain an ISO 639-3 language code for Lingwa de planeta, which was rejected the next year for the language "not appearing to be used in a variety of domains nor for communication within a community that includes all ages."

Sample text 
Pater Noster in Lingwa de planeta:

References

Literature 
 
 
 
 http://ifapcom.ru/files/Documents/multiling_eng.pdf#page=112

Mass media

External links 

 Grammar with examples
 Dictionary (with a short grammar)
 Lingwa de Planeta – Neutral language for international communication
 The Jiva magazine – “Life” – in Lidepla
 Classified word list (according to ULD by Rick Harrison) – with English, Russian, German, Esperanto and Novial translations
 Lingwa de planeta – a step towards the global language 

 Memrise course (other Lidepla-courses on Memrise)
 Facebook
 Yahoo
 Boards.net

Constructed languages
International auxiliary languages
Constructed languages introduced in the 2010s
2010 introductions